Itaquaquecetuba, also simply called Itaquá, is a municipality in the state of São Paulo, Brazil. It is part of the Metropolitan Region of São Paulo.

The municipality was founded between 1560 and 1563 by Jesuits led by Father Joseph of Anchieta, among native villages near the Tietê River, beginning with the Catholic chapel of Our Lady of Acute, which was established by Father Joseph. The settlement saw little development, and was almost deserted by the early twentieth century. Until 1958 the city was a district of Mogi das Cruzes. Following the emancipation of the municipality that year, the first Mayor, Victorio Eugenio Deliberato, began a campaign of industrial development that had great geographic and economic impact on Itaquaquecetuba in the decades to come.

Today, Itaquaquecetuba is one of the 10 best Brazilian cities who had significant advances in challenges against inequality in the last 20 years, and has the second best GDP in the region.

History 
The origin of the city dates back to Itaquaquecetuba of the twelve villages founded by the Jesuit priest José de Anchieta, in his long stay in Brazil. Its creation is due to the then president of the province, Bernardo José Pinto Gavião Peixoto, named village of Nossa Senhora da Ajuda, on September 7, 1560, being established in the River Tietê, to catechize the guaianases.

Law and Government 
Itaquaquecetuba's City Hall is located at 267 Vereador José Fernandes da Silva Avenue.

Etymology
The name is derived from its first form in Tupi takwakisé-tube, whose full meaning is "place of abundant bamboo sharp as knives".

Transportation

Public Transportation
The city is served by Line 12 of CPTM (Companhia Paulista de Trens Metropolitanos). The commuter rail system has 3 train stations: Engenheiro Manoel, Aracaré and Itaquaquecetuba. Local bus service is provided by Expresso Planalto and Intercity buses are also available connecting the city to Poá, Mogi das Cruzes, Guarulhos, Arujá, Santa Isabel, Ferraz de Vasconcelos, Suzano and São Paulo. Many bus companies operate such routes under permission of EMTU - Empresa Metropolitana de Transportes Urbanos de São Paulo, a state-owned company.

Roads
Itaquaquecetuba is crossed by four highways:
 SP-56 Alberto Hinoto Highway
 SP-66 João Afonso de Souza Castellano Highway
 SP-70 Ayrton Senna Highway
 SP-21 Mário Covas Beltway

Geography

Climate 
The climate of the city, and across the Metropolitan Region of São Paulo, is Subtropical. Summer is largely slightly hot and rainy.

Education

Colleges and universities
 University of Guarulhos
 Technical School of Itaquaquecetuba - ETEC
 State Technological College of Itaquaquecetuba - FATEC
 Federal Institute of Education, Science and Technology of São Paulo - IFSP

Notable people
Cafu, former Football player
 Bento Hinoto, Mamonas Assassinas's guitarist

References

External links
  Itaquaquecetuba City Hall

 
1958 establishments in Brazil
Populated places established in 1958
Populated places established in 1560